Vijay Yadav
 Vijay Yadav 
 Born 21 March 1990 Bettiah Bihar